Piapoco is an Arawakan language of Colombia and Venezuela.

A "Ponares" language is inferred from surnames, and may have been Piapoco or Achagua.

History 
Piapoco is a branch of the Arawak language, which also includes Achagua and Tariana. Piapoco is considered a Northern Arawak language. There are only about 3,000 Piapoco speakers left today. These people live in the Meta, Vichada, and Guaviare rivers in Colombia Piapoco speakers also reside in Venezuela. It is an endangered language.

Geography/Background 
The Piapocos come from the larger tribe, the Piaroa, who are indigenous to the Amazon rain forest. The Piapoco people originally lived in the midsection of Rio Guaviare, later moving in the 18th century to avoid settlers, missionaries, and others.

Grammar 
A Piapoco-Spanish dictionary containing 2,500 words was written by Deloris Klumpp, in which botanical identification of plants were captured, although not all. The Piapoco language follows the following grammatical rules: plural suffix -nai used for animates only, derivational suffixes masculine -iri, feminine -tua, suffix -mi 'late, defunct,' nominalizing -si, declarative mood marker -ka. Piapoco is unique in that it seems to be a nominative-accusative language. There are eighteen segmental phonemes, fourteen consonant and four vowels in the Piapoco language.

Phonology

Consonants 

 /s̪/ can be pronounced as  among speakers who have had less contact with Spanish speakers.
 /k/ can be palatalized as  when after /i/, before another vowel.
 /w/ is pronounced as  when preceding front vowels.

Vowels 

Vowels can be nasalized [ã] when occurring before nasal consonants.

Bilingualism 
The word Piapoco is a Spanish nickname in reference to the toucan. Most Piapoco also speak Spanish. Speakers who have had less contact with Spanish speakers more often pronounce the phoneme "s" as a voiceless interdental fricative. Younger speakers of the Piapoco language tend to eliminate the "h" more than older speakers due to their contact with the Spanish language.

When a large portion of people come in contact with another language and are competent in it, their language gradually becomes more like the other. This allows for a gradual convergence, where grammar and semantics of one language begin to replicate the other.

References

 

Languages of Colombia
Languages of Venezuela
Arawakan languages